Monterreal is a small ski resort situated in the municipality of Arteaga, in the southeast of the Coahuila state, Mexico, located 40 minutes from Saltillo and 90 minutes from Monterrey. It is the only commercial ski center in Mexico.

The Monterreal ski center has two runs. The main slope has a run of 230 m (754.6 ft). A separate 45 m (148 ft) long slope was specially designed for beginners and toboggans.

The main slope has a spring-box type drag lift and the teaching/play area has a conveyor type lift. The main track has a slope of about 20 degrees. In terms of difficulty, it can be considered as a blue run.

It is generally possible to ski between December and February, with natural snow.

Climate

Monterreal features a Cold semi-arid climate BSk according to (Köppen) or BSlk (Trewartha) climate. The surrounding mountains capture more moisture and receive higher levels of precipitation, featuring an Oceanic climate. While the summer months witness the majority of precipitation, snow showers in winter are common when cold fronts from Texas reach the Sierra Madre Oriental.

External links 
 Monterreal Resort Golf Club and Ski
 Mexico, with a Colorado feel, MySA.com: Travel& City Guide
 Bosques de Monterreal (Forests of Monterreal), Official Site

Ski areas and resorts in Mexico
Sports venues in Coahuila